Rogersville and Jefferson Railroad Company was incorporated under special act of Tennessee on February 27, 1852.

Financing for the construction of the railroad and its rehabilitation after the American Civil War was obtained mainly through the State of Tennessee.

In 1867, the company constructed  of railroad line between Holston River, Tennessee and Rogersville, Tennessee.

The company was placed in receivership by the Governor of Tennessee in 1866 because it defaulted on the payment of the interest on its debt. The State of Tennessee appointed commissioners during the years 1867–1871 to sell the delinquent railroads on which the State had statutory liens. On March 20, 1872, Joseph Jacques, agent for the East Tennessee, Virginia and Georgia Railroad Company, bid $23,000 for the property. A court confirmed the sale on November 18, 1873. On December 26, 1873, the railroad line was sold to W. P. Elliott, who operated the line until September 13, 1877. On that date, W. P. Elliott conveyed the property to H. M. Aiken, who operated the property until October 24, 1884. On that date, Aiken conveyed the property to the Tennessee and Ohio Railroad Company.

The Tennessee and Ohio Railroad Company conveyed the property to East Tennessee, Virginia and Georgia Railroad Company on July 22, 1889.

The property eventually became part of Southern Railway Company on July 7, 1894, through its acquisition of the East Tennessee, Virginia and Georgia Railway Company.

See also 

 Confederate railroads in the American Civil War

Notes

References 
 Interstate Commerce Commission. Southern Ry. Co., Volume 37, Interstate Commerce Commission Valuation Reports, November 6, 1931. Washington: United States Government Printing Office, 1932. .

Defunct Tennessee railroads
Predecessors of the Southern Railway (U.S.)
Railway companies established in 1856
Railway companies disestablished in 1871
5 ft gauge railways in the United States